Tico Wells  (born March 5, 1961, Philadelphia, Pennsylvania) is an American actor, known for his role as Choir Boy in the 1991 film The Five Heartbeats. He has also appeared on The Cosby Show, 227, Hallmark movies and Beverly Hills, 90210. He was Tim in the movie The Wish List, and played Dexter Williams, the younger brother of Denzel Washington's character Demetrius Williams, in Mississippi Masala. He starred as Kirkland J. Ellis, III, in the independent film Big Ain't Bad, a romantic drama that won Auds honors at the Hollywood Black Film Festival. He made a cameo in the Martin Lawrence show, Martin as "Sweet Reggie."

Filmography

Film

Television

References

External links

1961 births
Living people
20th-century American male actors
21st-century American male actors
American male film actors
American male television actors
Male actors from Philadelphia
Actors from Pennsylvania